Rosie & Ruff in Puppydog Tales is a British children's television cartoon created by Hilary Hayton, creator of Crystal Tipps and Alistair. The show was narrated and scripted by Victoria Wood. The series was screened in Canada on the Knowledge Network and aired in 1989 before finally airing in its country of origin on 17 September 1992. The series was broadcast on the BBC only running for 13 episodes but was repeated through till 1996. In the mid and late 1990s, the series was later broadcast on the defunct children's cable and satellite television channel The Children's Channel and the former digital television network for children called Carlton Kids.

The cartoon revolves around Rosie, a sensible but cheerful dog who is teaching her friend Ruff, a rather naughty dog, lessons and morals.

During the beginning of each episode Rosie reports the news and at the end of each episode there is a song about what is learned during the episode.

Two VHS videos of the show were released in the early 1990s.

The show was also available briefly on the BBC Store website.

Episodes

References

External links

British children's animated television shows
1989 Canadian television series debuts
1989 Canadian television series endings
1992 British television series debuts
1992 British television series endings
BBC children's television shows
Animated television series about dogs
1980s Canadian animated television series
1980s Canadian children's television series
1990s British animated television series
1990s British children's television series